In radiology, Canga's bead symptom is the irregular appearance of uterus and nodular structures in tuba uterina observed in patients with genital tuberculosis.
It is named for Serif Canga (1906–1993), a Turkish Gynecologist, in 1971.

References 

Symptoms and signs: Urinary system
Tuberculosis
Radiologic signs